William J. Lyons Jr. (May 30, 1921 – April 11, 2014) was an American businessman and politician.

Born in Norwalk, Connecticut, Lyons went to the University of Notre Dame. He then served in the United States Army in Europe during World War II. Lyons owned Lyons Construction Company in Norwalk. He served one term in the Connecticut State Senate from 1973 to 1975 as a Republican.

Notes

|-

1921 births
2014 deaths
Burials in Saint John's Cemetery (Norwalk, Connecticut)
Businesspeople from Connecticut
Connecticut city council members
Republican Party Connecticut state senators
Military personnel from Connecticut
Politicians from Norwalk, Connecticut
University of Notre Dame alumni
20th-century American businesspeople
United States Army personnel of World War II